Jennifer Taylor may refer to:

 Jennifer Taylor (architect) (1935–2015), Australian architect
 Jennifer Taylor (writer) (born 1949), British author
 Jenny Taylor (scientist), Professor at the University of Oxford
 Jenny Taylor (born 1955), British cultural analyst and journalist
 Jennifer Taylor (actress) (born 1972), American actress
 Jen Taylor (born 1973), American voice actor
 Jennifer Taylor (skier) (born 1976), Argentinean alpine skier
 Jennifer Taylor (volleyball) (born 1980), British volleyball player
 Jennifer Taylor (Queer As Folk), a character in the American television series Queer as Folk

See also
 Jennifer Taylor-Clarke, fictional character on BBC TV series The Office
 Jen Taylor Friedman